A wool staple is a cluster or lock of wool fibres and not a single fibre.

For other textiles, the staple, having evolved from its usage with wool, is a measure of the quality of the fibre with regard to its length or fineness.

Etymology
Of uncertain origin but possibly a back-formation arising because part of the business of a wool-stapler was to sort and class the wool according to quality.

Staple strength
Staple strength is calculated as the force required to break per unit staple thickness, expressed as newtons per kilotex.

The staple strength of wool is one of the major determining factors of the sale price of greasy wool.

Virtually all fleece and better grade wool skirtings sold at auction in Australia are objectively measured prior to the sale with the average results printed in a catalogue.

At least 40 staples must be measured to in order to conform to the Australian Standard. Wools under 30 newtons per kilotex are considered tender. Currently wools over 40 newtons per kilotex are preferred and attract a premium. Seasonal conditions or the health of the sheep may influence the soundness (strength) of the wool.

Staple length
The staple length of the wool is the length of the staple, and highly correlated with mean fibre length in the top (hauteur).

Staple length generally determines the end use of wool, that is, whether it will be used in weaving or knitting. The longer wools, generally around 51 mm and longer and called combing types, are processed to worsted yarn. Short-stapled wools are more profitably used in the woollen section where high-grade material may be produced from superfine wool.

The Australian Standard requires that a sale lot has a minimum of 55 staples measured with the average calculated and produced. The variability of this measure is reported as the coefficient of variation (CV%).

See also
Micron (wool)
Staple (textiles)
Wool
Wool classing

References

Cottle, D.J. (1991). Australian Sheep and Wool Handbook. Melbourne, Australia: Inkata Press, 20-23. .

External links
 Breeds & Wool Uses - Lists different average staple lengths for various breeds, including pictures of measured staples lengths and staple-specific spinning notes.
 Raw Wool Testing
 Wool Types - Lists characteristics of various sheep breeds, including staple lengths and descriptions.

Sheep wool
Spinning